Jeanny is a given name. Notable people with the name include:

 Jeanny Canby (1929–2007), American archaeologist and scholar
 Jeanny Dom (born 1954), Luxembourgian table tennis player
 Jeanny Marc (born 1950), French National Assembly member

See also
"Jeanny" (song), a 1985 song by the Austrian musician Falco
Jean (disambiguation)
Jenny (disambiguation)